Mightiest Mother-in-Law (Chinese: 最强岳母) is a 24 episode Singaporean drama produced and telecast on Mediacorp Channel 8. The show aired at 9pm on weekdays and had a repeat telecast at 8am the following day. It stars Chen Liping, Thomas Ong, Paige Chua, Tong Bingyu, Jeffrey Xu and Bonnie Loo as the casts of this series.

Plot
Qi Hongzhe (Thomas Ong) is a married man with two children. He is married to Guan Shuhui (Paige Chua), and he has an affair with Zhou Ke'en (Tong Bing Yu). Family problems come as Zhou Ke'en and Guan Shuhui fight for Qi Hongzhe. Meanwhile, Guan Shuhui has the help of her mother, Liew Xiuzhu (Chen Liping) to help her tackle Zhou Ke'en.

Cast

Qi (Yinghao)'s Family

Liew (Xiuzhu)'s Family

Other cast members

Original Sound Track (OST)

Awards & Nominations

Star Awards 2018

Mightiest Mother-in-Law is up for 5 nominations.

The other drama serials also nominated for Best Drama Serial with My Friends from Afar, When Duty Calls, While We Are Young & Have A Little Faith.

It won 1 out of 5 nominations.

Development
Filming started in November 2016 and ended on 27 January 2017.

International broadcast
  - 8TV (Malaysia) - Aires starting 14 June 2018 on Mon to Thurs at 9.30pm

See also
 List of MediaCorp Channel 8 Chinese drama series (2010s)
 List of Mightiest Mother In Law episodes

References

Singapore Chinese dramas
2017 Singaporean television series debuts
2017 Singaporean television series endings
Channel 8 (Singapore) original programming